Cayman International School (CIS) is a private  school in Camana Bay, George Town, Grand Cayman, Cayman Islands. It is operated by International Schools Services (ISS) and serves levels nursery through grade 12. It has a  campus.

It educates children whose parents are from various countries.

History
Faulkner Academy opened in October 1994. ISS purchased the school in 2002, and its name changed to the current one the following year.

References

External links
 Cayman International School

Schools in George Town, Cayman Islands
Secondary schools in the Cayman Islands
Educational institutions established in 1994
1994 establishments in the Cayman Islands